"Whatever" is the first single by the American rock band Godsmack. Featured on the band's self-titled album, "Whatever" is one of Godsmack's most famous songs.

The song first appeared on a promotional bonus CD that came with some copies of All Wound Up.

"Whatever" was the longest-running song on the US Active Rock top 10 chart, remaining there for 33 weeks. Godsmack received much exposure when a disc jockey at WAAF, a radio station in Massachusetts, started playing this song on his show.

Song meaning
Lead singer Sully Erna and guitarist Tony Rombola wrote the song. Rombola said:

Chart positions
Singles U.S. Billboard

References

External links

1999 singles
Godsmack songs
1998 songs
Songs written by Sully Erna
Songs written by Tony Rombola
Republic Records singles
Universal Records singles